Perhaps Love is a 1987 Australian television film about a love affair between a Frenchman and an Australian.

Plot
Student radicals, Patric and Annie, have an affair in Bali in the 1960s. They promise to meet up in Kathmandu but she returns to Melbourne, marries a left-wing politician, Jack, and has children. Patric and Annie meet up 18 years later. He is now more politically conservative, but they rekindle their affair. She decides to leave her husband and family, but changes her mind.

Cast
Francois Dunoyer as Patric
Anne Grigg as Annie
John Sheerin as Jack
John Clayton as Ben
Nathaniel Hawkins as Matt
Kendall Monaghan as Susie
Lynne Murphy as Mother 
John Clayton as Jack

Production
It was the first of a proposed nine TV movies that were made as a part of a co-production deal between Revcom and ABC. Three were to be made in Australia, three in Europe with Australians; the common theme was to be "sentiment". (The other Australian movies were The Lizard King and Going Price aka A Matter of Convenience.) Filming was complete by June 1986 and involved shooting in the Philippines.

Reception
In August 1986 the Sydney Morning Herald reported that "the ABC have kept quiet about" the movie, "and understandably so."

The film did not screen until March 1988. The Sydney Morning Herald TV critic said the film had "endless boring flashbacks" and "the inedible print of its writer, Bob Ellis, who has made a career out of sardonically attacking the middle classes, ate into the script to an unimaginative degree." She also claimed "the ending was rather too twee."

References

External links
Perhaps Love at Peter Malone

Australian television films
1987 television films
1987 films
1980s English-language films
Films directed by Lex Marinos